One Arrow 95-1C is an Indian reserve of the One Arrow First Nation in Saskatchewan. It is 9 kilometres southwest of Alvena. In the 2016 Canadian Census, it recorded a population of 10 living in 4 of its 4 total private dwellings.

References

Indian reserves in Saskatchewan
Division No. 15, Saskatchewan